Hakim may refer to:

 Al-Ḥakīm (Arabic: الحكيم), one of the names of God in Islam, meaning "The All-Wise".
 Hakim (name), an Arabic masculine name, including a list of people bearing this name.
 Hakim (title), an Arabic name and title, used in both Arabic-speaking and Muslim countries.

Other
 Hakim Rifle, an Egyptian rifle
 Hakim Stout, a beer made in Ethiopia by Harar Brewery
 Hakim Expressway, Tehran, Iran

See also

 Al-Hakam (disambiguation)
 Joaquim and Joaquin, Portuguese and Spanish names sometimes pronounced similarly